Route 223 is a 128.6 km north/south highway on the south shore of the Richelieu River in Quebec. Its northern terminus is in Sorel-Tracy at the junction of Route 132 and its southern terminus is close to Lacolle, where it crosses the U.S. border at the Rouses Point–Lacolle 223 Border Crossing and continues into New York state as U.S. Route 11.

Municipalities along Route 223
 Notre-Dame-du-Mont-Carmel
 Saint-Paul-de-l'Île-aux-Noix
 Saint-Jean-sur-Richelieu
 Chambly
 Carignan
 McMasterville
 Beloeil
 Saint-Marc-sur-Richelieu
 Saint-Antoine-sur-Richelieu
 Saint-Roch-de-Richelieu
 Sorel-Tracy

See also

 List of Quebec provincial highways

References

External links 

 Interactive Provincial Route Map (Transports Québec) 

223
Transport in Saint-Jean-sur-Richelieu
Transport in Sorel-Tracy